Malay Banerjee (born 17 January 1955) is an Indian former cricketer. He played nine first-class matches for Bengal between 1976 and 1981.

See also
 List of Bengal cricketers

References

External links
 

1955 births
Living people
Indian cricketers
Bengal cricketers
Cricketers from Kolkata